De Geus is a Dutch surname. In the Middle Ages "geus" (derived from French "gueux") meant "beggar" or "rogue", but it is likely that the surname originally reflected an association with the geuzen, the group that from 1566 opposed Spanish rule in the Netherlands. In contrast the surname Geus has a patronymic origin, with Geus being a short form of the given name Goswin. People with the surname "de Geus" include:

Aart de Geus (born 1954), Dutch businessman
Aart Jan de Geus (born 1955), Dutch politician
Arie de Geus (born 1930), Dutch businessman
Brett de Geus (born 1997), American baseball player for the Texas Rangers
Jonas de Geus, Dutch field hockey player
Leon de Geus (born 1971), Dutch darts player
Lilian de Geus (born 1991), Dutch competitive sailor
Pieter de Geus (1929-2004), Dutch politician

See also
Gilles de Geus, Dutch comics
 De Geus, publishing house affiliated with Singel Uitgeverijen

References

Dutch-language surnames